Celebrity Cruises is a cruise line headquartered in Miami, Florida and a wholly owned subsidiary of Royal Caribbean Group. Celebrity Cruises was founded in 1988 by the Greece-based Chandris Group, and merged with Royal Caribbean Cruise Line in 1997. Celebrity's signature logo is an "Χ" displayed on the funnel of Celebrity ships, and is the Greek letter chi, for "Chandris".

History

Chandris Group (1988–1997)

Founding and first ship SS Meridian 

Celebrity Cruises was founded in April 1988 as a subsidiary of the Greece-based Chandris Group to operate upmarket cruise ships to Bermuda. Chandris had been involved in cruise traffic since the 1960s, and during the late 1980s the company operated in the United States market under the brand name Chandris Cruises. Chandris Fantasy Cruises targeted the lower end of the cruise passenger market, with fleets consisting of second-hand ocean liners. Celebrity Cruises came into existence when, in April 1988, Home Lines, at the time one of the world's leading premium cruise lines, was sold to Holland America Line. Home Lines' ships had held two of the five contracts offered by the Government of Bermuda to cruise lines, giving the ships priority berthing arrangement and unlimited access of sail to the islands in exchange for the ships sailing to Bermuda between April and October each year. Although these contracts were highly valued, Holland America Line decided to withdraw the former Home Lines ships from this service, leaving an opening for two new ships to gain access. Chandris wanted to acquire the contracts, but the Government of Bermuda was only willing to award them to upmarket cruise lines, which Chandris Fantasy Cruises was not.

In order to gain the Bermuda Government contracts, Chandris created Celebrity Cruises and immediately began negotiating with the Bermuda Government in April 1988.

Celebrity Cruises adopted the Chandris "X" which was slightly stylized for their logo. The new line advertised themselves as a “Luxury Cruising by Design", with the strategy of offering and upscale product with mass-market pricing.  The ships would have refined interiors, destinations and dining, which included a partnership with famed chef Michel Roux, a unique thing for a cruise line at the time. Quoted by then chairman, John Chandris, "“We will feature comfort and quality, not glitz and glitter."

First new-builds: Horizon and Zenith 

It would be the lines first purpose built new build.

Century class debut 

Celebrity ordered a trio of newbuilds at Meyer Werft, known as the Century class, with first ship the Century debuting in 1996, followed by the Galaxy and Mercury. These would be the last ships designed under the Chandris family management.

Royal Caribbean Group (1997–present) 
In 1997, the Chandris family sold its interests in Celebrity Cruises to Royal Caribbean Cruise Line, leading to the formation of Royal Caribbean Cruises Ltd. (later Royal Caribbean Group) as a holding company to keep both brands separate, and the renaming of Royal Caribbean Cruise Line to Royal Caribbean International. Following the delivery of the Mercury, the lines first ship, the Meridian, was sold to Singapore-based Sun Cruises.

Millenium class debut 

The new class of ship introduced a new hull livery, with dark blue hull, gold stripes, and red accents on the mast an funnel. The livery was short Iived, and after a few years would revert to Celebrity's original white hull, dark blue stripe color scheme.
In 2005, the Horizon was transferred to the fleet Royal Caribbean's United Kingdom-based subsidiary Island Cruises. In the same year, the first ship of what was to be named Solstice class was ordered from Meyer Werft. By 2007, three more ships of this class were on order.

The ships would have joined the Celebrity Expeditions sub-brand, but in the end the decision was made to form an entirely new line, Azamara Cruises, to operate these ships in 2007. Also in 2007 the Zenith was transferred to Pullmantur Cruises 'in exchange' for the Azamara ships. Transfer of the Zenith also meant the end of Celebrity Cruises' association with Bermuda for the time being, as no ship was brought in to replace her on the cruises to Bermuda. In April 2010, The Celebrity Summit began to reposition yearly to New Jersey to offer cruises to Bermuda.

In 2007–2008, all of Celebrity Cruises' ships were renamed with a "Celebrity" prefix added to the pre-existing ship names.

Solstice class debut 
, the first ship in the new Solstice class, was delivered to Celebrity on 24 October 2008. In May 2009 Galaxy was transferred to the fleet of TUI Cruises, a joint venture between Celebrity Cruises' owner Royal Caribbean Group and TUI AG and renamed as Mein Schiff.

In 2011,  was sold by Celebrity fleet to become Mein Schiff 2 for TUI Cruises. The fourth Solstice-class ship the  entered service in 2011. The  was delivered in 2012.

In 2014, Celebrity Cruises launched a blog called "Catalyst," which covered travel, fashion and culture.

Edge class debut 

On 4 December 2014, Celebrity Cruises signed of a letter of intent for a new class of vessels. The two 2,900-guest, 117,000 GT ships, would be developed under the project name EDGE and will build upon the brand's Millennium-class and Solstice-class vessels. The Edge class introduced a new livery for the brand, with blue painted hulls that would be incorporated on the rest of the fleet as part of the Celebrity revolution initiative.

In December 2014, Lisa Lutoff-Perlo, a 32-year veteran of Celebrity Cruises, was promoted to president and chief executive officer, making her "the first woman to be named CEO of a major cruise line".

On 14 March 2016, Celebrity Cruises announced the planned acquisition of Galápagos Islands tour operator Ocean Adventures and its two ships, the 48-guest MV Eclipse (now Celebrity Xperience) and the 16-guest catamaran MC Athala II (now Celebrity Xploration). The move expanded Celebrity's guest capacity in the Galápagos by 65 percent.

Celebrity Cruises announced on 11 October 2017, that it would perform legal same-sex marriages on its ships while in international waters following the legalization of same-sex marriage in Malta, where most of the Celebrity fleet is registered. The company already hosted same-sex marriages while docked in jurisdictions where they are legal, but the change in Maltese law allowed the company's captains to perform legally-recognized marriages while in international waters.

In July 2018, the company announced its intention to invest more than $500 million to refurbish all Millennium-class and Solstice-class ships in the company's fleet between 2019 and 2023.

In 2020, due to the worldwide COVID-19 pandemic, sailings were suspended, on various dates in the various regions. On 12 January 2021, a report indicated that sailings were suspended worldwide "through April 30, including the May 1 transatlantic cruise on Celebrity Apex". Between May and October 2021, "Europe and transatlantic cruises on Celebrity Edge and Celebrity Constellation will also be suspended May through Oct. 2021".

On 19 March 2021, Celebrity Cruises announced that it would be resuming its North America cruises in June sailing out of St. Maarten and that in order to board all adults to include crew will be required to show proof that they got a COVID-19 vaccination. Children were allowed to show proof of a negative COVID-19 test within 72 hours. On 26 June, Celebrity Edge became the first cruise ship to leave the United States with ticketed passengers since March 2020. It set sail from Port Everglades in Fort Lauderdale, Florida.

On 29 August 2022, a tugboat strike caused  to delay its departure from the Port of Vancouver by almost 12 hours of delay.

Fleet

Current fleet

Future fleet

Former fleet

References

External links 

Official website
Official UK website

Companies based in Miami
Companies based in Miami-Dade County, Florida
Cruise lines
Royal Caribbean Group
1988 establishments in Florida
American companies established in 1988
Transport companies established in 1988